The Andrews Professor of Astronomy is a chair in astronomy in Trinity College Dublin was established in 1783 in conjunction with the establishment of Dunsink Observatory. 

Dunsink was founded in 1785 following a bequest by Provost Francis Andrews in 1774, which also funded the professorship. It was regulated by a new Statute of Trinity College Dublin, which required the professor to "make regular observations of the heavenly bodies ... and of the sun, moon and planets". The chair was suspended in 1921 and in 1947 the observatory passed to Dublin Institute for Advanced Studies. In 1984 the professorship was revived as an honorary title in the Department of Pure and Applied Mathematics.

From 1793, under letters patent of King George III, the Andrews Professor held the title Royal Astronomer of Ireland. This title fell vacant in 1921 and has not been revived.

List of the professors

 1783-1790: Henry Ussher (1741–1790)
 1790-1827: John Brinkley (1763–1835)
 1827-1865: William R Hamilton (1805–1865) 
 1865-1874: Franz Brünnow (1821–1891)
 1874-1892: Robert Ball (1840–1913)
 1892-1897: Arthur Rambaut (1859-923)
 1897-1906: Charles Joly (1864–1906)
 1906-1912: Edmund Whittaker (1873–1956)
 1912–1921: Henry Plummer (1875–1946)
 1921–1984: suspended 
 1984–1996: Patrick Wayman
 1997: vacant
 1998–2019: Luke Drury
 2019–present: Luciano Rezzolla

References

Astronomy in Ireland
Professorships at Trinity College Dublin